Pachybrachis nigricornis is a species of case-bearing leaf beetle in the family Chrysomelidae. It is found in Central America and North America.

Subspecies
These four subspecies belong to the species Pachybrachis nigricornis:
 Pachybrachis nigricornis autolycus Fall, 1915 i c g b
 Pachybrachis nigricornis carbonarius Haldeman, 1849 i c g
 Pachybrachis nigricornis difficilis Fall, 1915 i c g b
 Pachybrachis nigricornis nigricornis (Say, 1824) i c g
Data sources: i = ITIS, c = Catalogue of Life, g = GBIF, b = Bugguide.net

References

Further reading

 

nigricornis
Articles created by Qbugbot
Beetles described in 1824